"The Corner" is the second single released by rapper Common on his sixth album, Be. It features a chorus and production by Kanye West as well as spoken word lyrics by The Last Poets. The song's lyrics deal with street corners in poor neighborhoods. The song's beat contains samples from "You Make the Sun Shine" by The Temprees and "What It Is" by The Temptations. Because of the song's gritty sound, some fans considered it to be a return to Common's Resurrection days. A music video directed by Kanye West was made for "The Corner."

Acclaim
"The Corner" attained some commercial success reaching #42 on the Hot R&B/Hip-Hop Singles & Tracks chart, but was even more popular among critics. Amongst other accolades, it was nominated as the Best Rap Performance by a Duo or Group at the 48th Grammy Awards. Spence D. of IGN.com explains the basis for its success writing:  
In addition, Nathan Brackett of Rolling Stone states that it is one of the "hardest-rocking tracks of Common's career." Pitchfork Media's Tom Breihan considers the beat to be "dusty and heavenly." Steve Juon of RapReviews.com claims Common's lyrics to contain profound observations of urban life that show why hip hop is the "black man's CNN."
 Common understands that critics consider "The Corner" to be a return from his Electric Circus style. As he says on "They Say" from his 2005 album Be: "They say the crochet pants and the sweater was wack/Seen 'The Corner', now they say that nigga's back."

Remixes
The official remix featuring Kanye West, The Last Poets, Scarface, Mos Def and a new verse by Common can be found on Scarface's 2005 album My Homies Part 2. It was also released by Common as a single.
This song was covered with heavily revised lyrics by Clipse on their We Got It 4 Cheap: Vol. 2 mixtape.

Track listing

A-side
 "The Corner" (Radio) (3:46)
 "The Corner" (Instrumental) (3:46)
 "The Corner" (Radio A Capella) (3:34)

B-side
 "The Corner" (LP) (3:46)
 "The Corner" (LP A Capella) (3:46)
 "The Corner" (Last Poet Reprise) (3:46)

Chart positions

See also
List of Common songs

References

2005 singles
Common (rapper) songs
Kanye West songs
Song recordings produced by Kanye West
Songs written by Kanye West
GOOD Music singles
Songs written by Common (rapper)
Music videos directed by Kanye West
2005 songs